2022 Peruvian protests may refer to:

 2021–2022 Peruvian mining protests, which protested the lack of benefit to the local community from the mining of the Las Bambas copper mine
 2022 Peruvian economic protests, which broke out due to rising fuel prices amidst the 2022 Russian invasion of Ukraine and after the second impeachment attempt against President Pedro Castillo
 2022–2023 Peruvian political protests, which were against the impeachment and removal of President Pedro Castillo after his failed self-coup attempt